Halfway Down the Sky is the first studio album by the American rock band Splender. It was released on May 18, 1999 and has spawned two singles: "Yeah, Whatever" and "I Think God Can Explain". The album has sold  226,000 in the US. The album title comes from a line in the chorus of the song "I Apologize".

Track listing

Personnel 
Credits adapted from AllMusic

Splender
Waymon Boone - vocals, guitars, arranger
James Cruz - bass, vocals, arranger
Jonathan Svec	- lead guitar, piano, backing vocals
Marc Slutsky - drums, percussion

Cover 
Chris Wozniak - photography

Production
James Diener - A&R
Luke Ebbin - organ, programming
Scott Gormley - engineer
Todd Rundgren - producer, engineer
Mike Shipley - mixing
David Swope, Doug Wynne - assistant engineers

Chart performance 
The album debuted at No.36 on the Billboard Heatseekers charts on April 22, 2000. It peaked at No. 11 on May 27, 2000.

References 

Albums produced by Todd Rundgren
1999 debut albums
Splender albums